Ali Umar, Commissioner of Sports of Maldives (born 5 August 1980) is a Maldivian former footballer until his retirement in 2013. After he retired, he became a Member of the normalization committee appointed by FIFA to Football Association of Maldives from 2 December 2014 to 31 May 2016. Later he was elected to vice president and as an executive committee member for Football Association of Maldives. In 27 March 2018 he was appointed as the Commissioner of Sports of Maldives.

Ali Umar was also a member of the Maldives national football team.

Honours

Maldives
 SAFF Championship: 2008

References

1980 births
Living people
Maldivian footballers
Maldives international footballers
Club Valencia players
New Radiant S.C. players
People from Malé
Association football midfielders
Association football forwards
Footballers at the 2002 Asian Games
Asian Games competitors for the Maldives